Ronald Horn (May 24, 1938 – October 5, 2002) was a professional basketball player who played in the NBA and ABA. Ron was drafted with the seventh pick in the second round of the 1961 NBA Draft by the St. Louis Hawks. After playing one season with the Hawks, Ron played with the Los Angeles Lakers for a season. Horn also played in 1967–68 for the Denver Rockets of the ABA.

Horn played college basketball for Indiana University, spending one season (1958–59) on the varsity squad with future NBA star Walt Bellamy and collegiate coach Bob Reinhart.  Following his sophomore season, Horn entered the U.S. Military and spent two years (1959–60, 1960–61) playing AAU Men's Basketball on the U.S. Armed Forces team.

Horn played scholastically for the Mississinewa High School Indians; leading them to an IHSAA Sectional and Regional titles in 1954.  To date, the 1953–54 season remains the deepest IHSAA-tournament run for the Indians.

References

External links
Ron Horn at TheDraftReview

1938 births
2002 deaths
Amateur Athletic Union men's basketball players
American men's basketball players
Basketball players from Indiana
Denver Rockets players
Indiana Hoosiers men's basketball players
Long Beach Chiefs players
Los Angeles Lakers players
People from Marion, Indiana
San Francisco Saints players
Small forwards
St. Louis Hawks draft picks
St. Louis Hawks players